Radio Le Mans is the English language radio service for the 24 Hours of Le Mans race, as well as for numerous other sports car events.
It first broadcast at the 1987 24 Hours of Le Mans.

History 
The commentary was broadcast on local ('special event') radio in 1986, in 1987 headed by a sports car and radio enthusiast, Harry Turner, backed by Jim Tanner and Chris Crewe-Smith, founders of TTC radio. Backed by Silk Cut Jaguar the station quickly found favour with the tens of thousands of English-speaking fans at the race. The early years provided for only a very rudimentary service, no pit reports and a music loop played overnight.

Throughout the late 1980s and early 1990s the station evolved adding new features like the 'Mad' Friday Campsite Tour in 1989. This show, conceived and presented by a newcomer, John Hindhaugh, was to prove almost as popular as the race coverage, and propelled Hindhaugh, with his distinctive North-Eastern accent and irreverent attitude, to a similar status with the fans as the commentary team. Resident statistician Paul Truswell, famed for not only remaining standing at his microphone throughout the 24 hours (and more) but also not urinating during this entire time, has been ever-present on the Radio Le Mans commentary team since 1988.

Haymarket Publications, publishers of Autosport had been involved almost from the start. At first only giving ad pages which were then "sold on" by Radio Le Mans to raise funds. When Studio 6 and Landon Brown, the first operators of the service, stepped aside Haymarket took over the running of the service and remained in control until 2005.

Radio Le Mans has been available to listeners at the circuit every year since 1987. In 1997 it began streaming on the internet.

From 2004 to 2006 the service was also available to digital satellite listeners, as it was carried on the Globecast Radio channel on the Sky Digital (UK & Ireland) platform in the UK. Globecast Radio also carried coverage of the American Le Mans Series. Globecast Radio ceased broadcasting in January 2007.

Since 2006 the service has been run by Radio Show Ltd., RSL was formed specifically to ensure the continuation of Radio Le Mans when Haymarket Publications declined to renew their contract with the ACO. RSL was given an initial five-year contract.

The website radiolemans.com now runs a sports car and automotive audio stream all year which includes live coverage of other races from around the world, including those of the FIA World Endurance Championship, European Le Mans Series, Nurburgring 24 and Britcar 24. In addition, there is an extensive, free archive of all of the Radio Show Limited broadcasts.

Over time new ways to listen to the Radio Le Mans coverage of the 24 hours were added. In 2008 the service was bundled with the Kangaroo TV system at Le Mans, (although that system has since ceased to exist), and in 2009 Radio Le Mans made its debut on Sirius satellite radio in the US and Canada.

RSL audio was also used as the narrative in the movies "Truth in 24" and the sequel, plus the 2013 Patrick Dempsey documentary which aired on Velocity in the USA in addition to appearing in vision in all of these productions, main presenter/commentator and owner John Hindhaugh provided commentary for the Jota documentary "Journey to Le Mans". As well as the Amazon Video series "Le Mans: Racing Is Everything" using Radio Le Mans audio for all of the commentary that was included over the six episodes as well as including interviews with John Hindhaugh.

Mid-2017, RSL rebranded their collection of radio broadcasts from Radio Le Mans to RS1, IMSA Radio to RS2 IMSA Radio and the creation of a new station, RS3, which like RS1 and RS2 broadcasts 24 hours a day. RS3, was previously RSL Extra, which only broadcast when required, in cases where three live events coincided. Reflecting this change of branding for the channels, the main portal was switched to www.radio-show.co.uk although the www.RadioLeMans.co domain is still active and RSL retain the licence, granted by the ACO, for the operation of Radio Le Mans on FM at the track.

Le Mans 24 Hour presenters and commentators

Other race coverage 

Radio Show Limited, the people behind Radio Le Mans, also provide internet radio commentary on every round of the American Le Mans Series, Le Mans Series, Nürburgring 24 hour race, and Silverstone 24 hour race. There is also coverage of other motorsport events, car tests, and motorsport magazine shows.

In August 2009, a sister channel called RLM Extra, later renamed to RSL Extra, was launched to allow for web streaming of two events simultaneously. This launched with coverage of the 2CV 24 hours from Snetterton, while the main channel ran coverage of the ALMS from Mid Ohio. However, with few clashing events this service wasn't been used much after 2010. In 2016 it was used several times when IMSA and ELMS/Le Mans Cup races clashed

In 2011 the 360 Motor Racing Club 6 Hour race was added to the list of events covered on Radio Le Mans.

In 2012 Radio Le Mans added coverage of the Dubai 24 Hours

2012 also saw RSL air live coverage of the Rolex 24 at Daytona for the first time. The team provided full 24-hour race commentary plus live coverage of all the practice and qualifying sessions, the only broadcaster to do so.  The audio was also used for Motors TV's 15 hours of live television coverage, and on Speed.com as its overnight feed when the linear service was off air.

From 2013 onwards, Radio Le Mans covered the Bathurst 12 Hour.

Radio Le Mans began covering Creventic's 24H Series in 2015, which was also broadcast live on the English lingual MotorsTV and the live stream, as well as the Japanese Super GT series with the 3rd round of 2016 at Sportsland SUGO, streamed over live video on Nissan's NISMO.TV.

From 2017 onwards, Radio Le Mans will cover the German VLN championship making them the primary and only English commentary for the full series.

American Le Mans Series radio 
Since the first Petit Le Mans race in 1998, John Hindhaugh and other members of the Radio Le Mans team provided commentary of every round of the American Le Mans Series until the end of 2010 when the series decided to axe its radio coverage as part of its new TV contract.

In the year 2000, the team also covered two European Le Mans Series races, at Silverstone and the Nurburgring, and the Race of 1000 Years held in Adelaide, Australia.

The service, known as the American Le Mans Radio Network, is not only streamed on the internet but also carried on the Sirius satellite radio & XM satellite radio service, usually on XM144 Sport Nation.

The service is also broadcast at each track on 454 MHz, and occasionally also carried on local AM and FM stations.

After the ALMS axed its radio service at the end of 2010, Radio Le Mans continued to cover the races at Sebring and Petit Le Mans, which were also part of the Intercontinental Le Mans Cup, and Sebring in 2012 which was part of the FIA World Endurance Championship.

The ALMS merged with Grand-Am in 2014 to form the United Sports Car Championship, which was run by the International Motor Sport Association (IMSA). In 2015 IMSA and Radio Le Mans' owners RSL launched a radio service for the series called IMSA Radio.

ALMS and IMSA radio commentators and reporters

Le Mans Series, ILMC and FIA World Endurance Championship radio coverage 

In 2008 Radio Le Mans began live coverage of the Le Mans Series, starting with the second round of the championship at Monza in Italy.

As with the American Le Mans Series the coverage was streamed on the internet, and at the Nürburgring and Silverstone it was also available locally on AM or FM frequencies.

In 2009 the opening round at Barcelona was again missed, due to a date clash with the American Le Mans Series, however, coverage resumed at Spa-Francorchamps for the second round of the series.

In 2010 all rounds of the championship were covered live, as was the ILMC race in China.

For 2011, all rounds of the ILMC and Le Mans Series were covered.
In 2012 the ILMC was replaced by a new championship, the FIA World Endurance Championship. This and the Le Mans Series, now called the European Le Mans Series were both covered in full.

ILMC, WEC & Le Mans Series commentators and reporters

Nürburgring 24 hours radio coverage 

Radio Le Mans first covered the Nürburgring 24 hours race as part of its Le Mans 24 hour coverage in 2006 (the races ran on the same dates that year).

The following year saw the first English-language commentary of the race, however, unlike the Le Mans commentary this did not run for the full 24 hours but stopped for six hours during the night. That year the race itself stopped for a time during the night as thick fog caused a red flag period.

The Nürburgring 24 hours was successful enough that it has been repeated in 2008 and 2009, but using the same format of covering the first ten, and final eight hours of the race, rather than the full 24 hours. However, in 2010 the entire race was broadcast live with John Hindhaugh, Paul Truswell and Graham Goodwin pulling out almost a 24-hour live shift. The same was repeated in 2011, with Jim Roller joining the commentary trio once again.

Unlike the former Le Mans Series race at the Nürburgring, coverage of the Nürburgring 24 hours is not simulcast on FM. It is only available online.

Nürburgring 24 hours commentators

Sim racing
As motorsport was suspended during the COVID-19 pandemic, Radio Show Limited has produced sim racing broadcasts for IMSA WeatherTech SportsCar Championship and the Nurburgring Endurance Series.

References

External links
Official site

Auto racing mass media
Radio stations in France
Sports radio stations in the United Kingdom
Radio stations established in 1987
Mass media in Le Mans
Internet radio stations